Mayuko Kamio (神尾 真由子, born June 12, 1986 in Toyonaka, Osaka) is a  Japanese violinist.

Biography 
Kamio currently studies with Zakhar Bron at the Hochschule Musik und Theater (HMT) in Zurich, Switzerland. She plays a Stradivarius from 1727, previously owned by Joseph Joachim, on loan from Suntory. She has appeared with renowned orchestras, including the Orchestre Philharmonique de Monte Carlo, the Russian National Orchestra, the BBC Philharmonic, and the Zürcher Kammerorchester. She won the Young Concert Artists International Auditions in 2000 and first prize for violin in the International Tchaikovsky Competition in 2007.

Kamio was born in Osaka, Japan in 1986, and began to play the violin at the age of four.  Her early teachers were Chikako Satoya, Machie Oguri and Chihiro Kudo, and she worked with Koichiro Harada at the Toho Gakuen School of Music.  Kamio studied in the U.S. with Dorothy DeLay and Masao Kawasaki at the Aspen Music Festival and the pre-college division of The Juilliard School.  She currently attends the Hochschule für Musik und Theater in Zurich, where she works with Zakhar Bron.

Kamio was one of three people (along with pianist Adam Neiman and Young Concert Artists manager Susan Wadsworth) who were the subjects of the 2003 documentary film Playing for Real, directed by Josh Aronson.  The film documents the difficulties in establishing a career in classical music.

In 2010, Kamio toured Japan with the Budapest Festival Orchestra under Iván Fischer playing the Mendelssohn Violin Concerto. On 2 October 2010, she played Fantasía sobre Carmen de Sarasate in Buenos Aires, Argentina.

References

External links
Artist's website, accessed 23 June 2010
Young Concert Artists, Inc biography and contact, accessed 23 June 2010
Aspen artist's page, accessed 23 June 2010

1986 births
Living people
Japanese classical violinists
People from Toyonaka, Osaka
Toho Gakuen School of Music alumni
Prize-winners of the International Tchaikovsky Competition
21st-century classical violinists
Women classical violinists